Neal Peters McCurn (April 6, 1926 – September 7, 2014) was a United States district judge of the United States District Court for the Northern District of New York from 1979 to 2014 and Chief Judge from 1988 to 1993.

Education and career

Born in Syracuse, New York, McCurn received an Artium Baccalaureus degree from Syracuse University in 1950. He received a Bachelor of Laws from Syracuse University College of Law in 1952. He served in the United States Naval Reserve as a Cadet-Midshipman from 1944 to 1946. He was in private practice of law in Syracuse from 1952 to 1979. He was the President of the City of Syracuse Common Council in New York from 1968 to 1979.

Federal judicial service

McCurn was nominated by President Jimmy Carter on September 28, 1979, to the United States District Court for the Northern District of New York, to a new seat created by 92 Stat. 1629. He was confirmed by the United States Senate on October 31, 1979, and received his commission on November 2, 1979. He served as Chief Judge from 1988 to 1993. He assumed senior status on April 6, 1993, serving in that status until his death on September 7, 2014, in Syracuse.

References

Sources
 

1926 births
2014 deaths
New York (state) city council members
Judges of the United States District Court for the Northern District of New York
United States district court judges appointed by Jimmy Carter
20th-century American judges
Syracuse University alumni
Syracuse University College of Law alumni
Lawyers from Syracuse, New York
United States Navy personnel of World War II
United States Navy officers
United States Navy reservists